Petronella Johanna de Timmerman (31 January 1723, in Middelburg – 2 May 1786, in Utrecht) was a Dutch poet and scientist.

Married in 1769 to Johann Friedrich Hennert, professor of mathematics, astronomy and philosophy. During her second marriage, she conducted scientific experiments and studied physics with her spouse. She was inducted as an honorary member of the academy ‘Kunstliefde Spaart Geen Vlijt’ in 1774. She presented the academy with poems, translated French plays and planned to write a book about physics for women.

She suffered a stroke in 1776. Her widower wrote a biography about her and published her poems.

References 
Timmerman, Petronella Johanna de (1723/1724-1786)(Dutch)

1723 births
1786 deaths
18th-century Dutch women writers
18th-century Dutch writers
18th-century Dutch physicists
Dutch women poets
People from Middelburg, Zeeland
18th-century women scientists